Darren Thomas Ward (born December 2, 1968) is a former international freestyle swimmer who was born in the United States and attended Sonora High School in La Habra California, but competed for Canada at the 1988 Summer Olympics in Seoul, South Korea.  During those Olympics he finished in 21st position in the 200-metre individual medley, and in eighth place with the men's 4x200-metre freestyle relay team.  Ward also participated in the 1992 Summer Olympics in Barcelona, Spain.

See also
 List of Commonwealth Games medallists in swimming (men)

References

1968 births
Living people
Canadian male freestyle swimmers
Canadian male medley swimmers
Olympic swimmers of Canada
Sportspeople from Duluth, Minnesota
Swimmers at the 1987 Pan American Games
Swimmers at the 1988 Summer Olympics
Swimmers at the 1990 Commonwealth Games
Swimmers at the 1992 Summer Olympics
Commonwealth Games medallists in swimming
Commonwealth Games bronze medallists for Canada
Pan American Games silver medalists for Canada
Pan American Games medalists in swimming
Medalists at the 1987 Pan American Games
Medallists at the 1990 Commonwealth Games